Pilawa is a Polish coat of arms. It was used by many noble families known as szlachta in Polish in medieval Poland and later under the Polish–Lithuanian Commonwealth, branches of the original medieval Piława Clan (Pilawici) family as well as families connected with the Clan by adoption.

History
The progenitor of the Pilawa Clan was supposed to have been Żyrosław z Potoka, who was fighting the Prussians, a pagan tribe and brought himself glory in the Battle of Piława, where he fought along Bolesław IV the Curly. The legend states that Żyrosław reached the pagan chief, fought him in hand-to-hand combat and killed him. The terrified enemy hordes fled the battle field. The related legend tells also that in 1166, to commemorate the victory, Bolesław IV bestowed a coat of arms upon Żyrosław, naming it for the place, where the battle took place.

Blazon

The Pilawa coat of arms assumed its final form in the late 14th century. Formerly, there were two differing patterns, and the records from the years 1387, 1388 and 1389 mention that it had to be a letter "Z" with two and a half of a cross, or an arrow with two and a half of a cross.

Notable bearers
Notable bearers of this coat of arms have included:

 House of Potocki
 Mikołaj Potocki
 Jan Potocki
 Antoni Protazy Potocki
 Roman Ignacy Potocki
 Stanisław "Rewera" Potocki
 Józef Potocki
 Andrzej Potocki
 Feliks Kazimierz Potocki
 Katarzyna Potocka
 Alfred Józef Potocki
 Alfred Wojciech Potocki
 Roman Potocki
 Stanisław Kostka Potocki
 Józef Potocki
 Franciszek Salezy Potocki
 Stanisław Szczęsny Potocki
 Teodor Andrzej Potocki (Golden Piława)
 Wiktoria Elżbieta Potocka
 House of Kamieniecki
 Mikołaj Kamieniecki
 Ludwik Kamieniecki
 Marcin Kamieniecki
 Jan Kazimierz Kamieniecki
 Jan Kamieniecki
 Henryk Andreas Kamieniecki
 Piotr Kamieniecki
 Henryk Kamieniecki
 Dominik Kamieniecki
 Andrzej Kamieniecki
 Klemens Moskarzewski
 Anna Stanisławska

Family name changes during the Second World War and 1944–1953

The communist government of Poland was in deep opposition to every rich (specially noble) family. Hundreds of Potockis were killed by NKVD and Red Army. Many Potockis, who decided to stay in Poland were forced to change their family names (otherwise they could be killed, imprisoned or have other problems).

The most popular changes was from Potocki to Nowak, Kowalski, Gnejowicz, Stanisławski, Pryszkiewicz, Wszelaki, Petecki, Blacha, Musiał, Woldan, Walera, Melka, Madej and Pastuch.

Gallery

Paintings

See also
 Polish heraldry
 Heraldic family
 List of Polish nobility coats of arms

External links 
  Pilawa Coat of Arms and the bearers

Bibliography
 Tadeusz Gajl: Herbarz polski od średniowiecza do XX wieku : ponad 4500 herbów szlacheckich 37 tysięcy nazwisk 55 tysięcy rodów. L&L, 2007. .

Polish coats of arms